Jonathan Eduardo Cantillana Zorrilla (born 26 May 1992) is a professional footballer who plays as a midfielder for Liga 1 club PSS Sleman. Born in Chile, Cantillana is of Palestinian descent and represented Palestine internationally.

Club career
On 16 June 2016, Cantillana joined Malaysian side Kuala Lumpur City. He moved to Indonesian side PSIS Semarang on 8 September 2019.

International career
Cantillana was born and raised in Chile to Chilean parents of Palestinian descent. He was called up to the Palestine national team, and made his debut on 31 August 2015 in a friendly match away to Lebanon at the Saida Municipal Stadium.

Career statistics

International

International Goals
Scores and results list Palestine's goal tally first.

References

External links
 
 

1992 births
Living people
Citizens of the State of Palestine through descent
Palestinian footballers
Palestine international footballers
Chilean footballers
Chilean emigrants to Palestine
Segunda División Profesional de Chile players
Chilean Primera División players
West Bank Premier League players
Malaysia Premier League players
Egyptian Premier League players
Liga 1 (Indonesia) players
San Antonio Unido footballers
Club Deportivo Palestino footballers
Ahli Al-Khaleel players
Kuala Lumpur City F.C. players
ENPPI SC players
Hilal Al-Quds Club players
PSIS Semarang players
Association football forwards
Chilean people of Palestinian descent
Expatriate footballers in Chile
Expatriate footballers in Malaysia
Palestinian expatriate sportspeople in Malaysia
2019 AFC Asian Cup players
Palestinian expatriate sportspeople in Indonesia
Expatriate footballers in Indonesia